USS Pueblo (PF-13), a , was the second ship of the United States Navy to be named for Pueblo, Colorado.

Construction
The second Pueblo (PF-13) was laid down under Maritime Commission contract (MC hull 1431) at the Kaiser Cargo, Inc., Yard #4, in Richmond, California, on 14 November 1943; launched on 20 January 1944, sponsored by Seaman Carol Barnhart, USN (W); and commissioned on 27 May 1944.

Service history
Following shakedown off the southern California coast, Pueblo fitted out with highly sensitive meteorological instruments, reported for duty as a weather tracking ship with the Western Sea Frontier, on 26 October 1944.  Assigned to the Northern California Sector, and based at San Francisco, she patrolled on ocean weather stations, reporting weather conditions and acting as lifeguard ship beneath the trans-pacific air routes, until March 1946.  Then ordered to the east coast, she departed California on the 13th and headed for Charleston, South Carolina, and inactivation.

Decommissioned on 6 April 1946, she was sold to J. C. Berkwitz and Company, New York City, on 22 September 1947, and resold, a year later, to the government of the Dominican Republic.  Originally renamed Presidente Troncoso (F103), the ship was again renamed Gregorio Luperón, before being scrapped in 1982.

References

External links 
 
 hazegray.org: USS Pueblo
 

Tacoma-class frigates
Ships built in Richmond, California
1944 ships
World War II patrol vessels of the United States
Tacoma-class frigates of the Dominican Navy